Virginia Niarchakou  (born 5 December 1996) is a Greek female water polo player, playing as a centre forward. As a player of Olympiacos she won the 2014–15 LEN Euro League Women, the 2015 Women's LEN Super Cup and the 2014 Women's LEN Trophy.

References

1996 births
Living people
Olympiacos Women's Water Polo Team players
Greek female water polo players
Place of birth missing (living people)
Water polo players from Athens
21st-century Greek women